Weightlifting competitions at the 2019 Pan American Games in Lima, Peru are scheduled to be held between July 27 and 30, 2019 at the Coliseo Mariscal Caceres. The venue will also host the bodybuilding competitions.

In 2016, the International Olympic Committee made several changes to its sports program, which were subsequently implemented for these games. Included in the changes was a reduction of one men's weightlifting event. This means a total of 14 weightlifting events will be contested (seven per gender). A total of 126 weightlifters will qualify to compete at the games.

This event will serve as one of the events that will allow athletes to post qualifying weights for the weightlifting competitions at the 2020 Summer Olympics in Tokyo, Japan.

Medal table

Medalists

Men's events

Women's events

Participating nations
A total of 20 countries qualified athletes. The number of weightlifters a nation has entered is in parentheses beside the name of the country. A total of 123 lifters were entered.

Qualification

A total of 126 weightlifters (63 per gender) will qualify to compete at the games. A nation may enter a maximum of 12 weightlifters (six per gender). The host nation (Peru) automatically qualified the maximum team size. All other nations qualified through their team scores from both the 2017 and 2018 Pan American Championships combined. A further two wild cards were awarded (one per gender).

See also
Powerlifting at the 2019 Parapan American Games
Weightlifting at the 2020 Summer Olympics

References

External links
Results book

 
Events at the 2019 Pan American Games
Pan American Games
2019